The original Cockermouth railway station was the eastern terminus of the Cockermouth & Workington Railway. It served the town of Cockermouth, Cumbria, England.

History
The station opened on 28 April 1847. It closed on 2 January 1865, being replaced by the Cockermouth, Keswick and Penrith Railway station when the line was extended eastwards to Penrith using a different alignment.

After closure to passengers the station remained in use as a goods station until 1964. The station area included an engine shed which was opened on 28 April 1847, extended in 1858 and closed in 1876, after which it was converted for use as a goods shed. The shed was demolished in the mid-1990s.

See also

 Cockermouth, Keswick and Penrith Railway

References

Sources

Further reading

External links
Map of the line with photos in RAILSCOT
The station on an OS map surveyed in 1864 in National Library of Scotland
The station as a goods station on an OS map surveyed in 1898 in National Library of Scotland
The station as a goods station on an OS map surveyed in 1947 in National Library of Scotland
The station in Rail Map Online
The railways of Cumbria in Cumbrian Railways Association
Photos of Cumbrian railways in Cumbrian Railways Association
The railways of Cumbria in Railways_of_Cumbria
Cumbrian Industrial History in Cumbria Industrial History Society
Local history of the CKPR route in Cockermouth
The line's and station's Engineer's Line References in Railway Codes
A video tour-de-force of the region's closed lines in Cumbria Film Archive

Disused railway stations in Cumbria
Former London and North Western Railway stations
Railway stations in Great Britain opened in 1847
Railway stations in Great Britain closed in 1865
1847 establishments in England
Cockermouth